Tim Hunkin (born Timothy Mark Trelawney Hunkin, 27 December 1950 in London) is an English engineer, cartoonist, writer, and artist living in Suffolk, England. He is best known for creating the Channel Four television series The Secret Life of Machines, in which he explains the workings and history of various household devices. He has also created museum exhibits for institutions across the UK, and designed numerous public engineering works, chiefly for entertainment. Hunkin's works are distinctive, often recognisable by his unique style of papier-mâché sculpture (made from unpainted newsprint), his pen and ink cartoons, and his offbeat sense of humour.

Education
Hunkin graduated in engineering from Gonville and Caius College, Cambridge.

Work and career

Hunkin's Under the Pier Show at Southwold Pier, England, is a penny arcade featuring a number of humorous, coin-operated machines of his creation. Attractions include the "Autofrisk" (a device that simulates the experience of being frisked by multiple, inflated rubber gloves), the "Bathyscape" (a device that simulates a brief submarine adventure) and a somewhat rude sculptural clock. Hunkin has also opened Novelty Automation, an amusement arcade in Holborn, London, which has a more satirical tone, of which Hunkin has said "I don’t think political art has an enormous effect, but in the short term it is satisfying to reinforce people’s disrespect of the villains."

Many of his other projects are large-scale and theatrical, including gigantic clocks of unconventional designs, bonfires and pyrotechnic displays. In 1976, he designed the flying pigs and sheep for rock band Pink Floyd's In The Flesh tour, promoting their Animals album.

His displays are also featured in episodes of The Secret Life of Machines and relate to the machine covered by the programmes. These included a mountain of flaming televisions; flying vacuum cleaners fitted with rocket motors; a carhenge; a ballet of self-propelled portable radios; and a bizarre "pilgrimage" of an internal combustion engine carried, shoulder high, on a bier into the centre of Carhenge.  The Pink Floyd inflatable pig was also featured in the vacuum cleaner episode.  Other displays featured in the series were more informative, such as a free-standing central heating system and a "human sewing machine."  The programs also include his cartoons in voiced and animated form.

In 2013 he created a large, unfolding clock for the San Francisco Exploratorium.

During the 2020 COVID-19 pandemic Hunkin was inspired by other creators online to make a new series called The Secret Life of Components that  was distributed on YouTube beginning in March 2021. A second installment was distributed beginning 30 March 2022.

Books
Hunkin has published several books in his distinctive cartoon style. His first was a children's book, Mrs Gronkwonk and the Post Office Tower in 1973, which he recently made available again at Lulu.com.  In 1988 he published Almost Everything There Is To Know, a compilation of his comic strip The Rudiments of Wisdom, first published in The Observer.  He is also the author of the book Hunkin's Experiments  which describes a variety of science-based pranks, games, and curiosities. Content from both books is freely available online.

See also
 Sam Smith (toy-maker)
 Wilf Lunn
 Heinz Wolff
 Johnny Ball
 Adam Hart-Davis

References

1950 births
Living people
Engineers from Suffolk
English cartoonists
English non-fiction writers
Writers from Suffolk
Alumni of Gonville and Caius College, Cambridge
English male non-fiction writers